Canada was host country for the 1930 British Empire Games, which were held at Hamilton, Ontario, and was one of only eleven countries to be represented at the inaugural Games. 

Melville Marks (Bobby) Robinson of Canada had been asked to organise the inaugural British Empire Games in 1928. 

At these first Games, Canada won 54 medals against England's 61.

Newfoundland competed separately at the 1930 British Empire Games, but did not win any medals. Newfoundland also sent a team to the 1934 British Empire Games, but from 1938 has competed as part of Canada.

Medals

Athletics

Men's 100 Yard Dash
 Percy Williams - Gold, 9.9 s
 Johnny R. Fitzpatrick - Bronze, 10.2 s
 James/Jim "Buster" R. Brown - 3rd in Heat 2
 Leigh Miller - 4th in Heat 3

Men's 120 Yard Hurdles
 Howard Baker - 4th in Heat 1 
 Arthur "Art" Ravensdale - Disqualified
 Bill Pierdon - Disqualified

Men's 220 Yard Dash
 Johnny R. Fitzpatrick - Silver
 James "Jimmy" A. Ball - 5th in Final
 Napoleon Bourdeau - 3rd in Heat 2
 Frederick "Fred" William McBeth - 4th in Heat 3

Men's 440 Yard Run/Quarter Mile
 Alexander S. Wilson - Gold, 48.8 s
 James "Jimmy" A. Ball - 5th in Final, 49.4 s (in Heat ?)
 Stan B. Glover - 3rd in Heat 2
 John Hickey - 4th in Heat 2
 Walter Connolly - 4th in Heat 3

Men's 440 Yard Hurdles
 Walter Connolly - 5th in Final
 John Hickey - 6th in Final
 Frederick "Fred" William McBeth - Heat 

Men's 880 Yard Run/Half-Mile
 Alexander S. Wilson - Bronze, 1 min 54.9 s
 Percy Pickard - 8th in Final
 Brant Little - 6th in Heat 1

Men's 1 Mile Run
 Jack S. Walters - 4th in Final 

Men's 2 Mile Steeplechase
 Art S. Wilkins - 4th in Final
 Bill Reid - 5th in Final
 Pete Suttie - 6th in Final

Men's 3 Mile Run
 Walter Hornby
 Fred Sargeant
 George Ball

Men's 6 Mile Run
 Billy Reynolds - 6th
 Wilf McCluskey - 8th
 George Irwin - 9th
 Harold Webster - 10th

Men's 4 x 110 Yard Relay
 Canada - Gold, 42.2 s
 James/Jim "Buster" R. Brown
 Johnny R. Fitzpatrick
 Leigh Miller
 Ralph A. Adams

Men's 4 x 440 Yard Relay/1 Mile Relay
 Canada - Silver, 3 min 19.8 s
 Alexander S. Wilson
 Arthur "Art" Alan Scott
 James "Jimmy" A. Ball
 Stan B. Glover

Men's Marathon
 Johnny Miles - Bronze, 2 h 48 min 23 s
 Percival Wyer - 4th
 Silas McLellan - 6th
 Norman Dack - 7th
 Ezra Lee - 10th
 Jack/John Cuthbert - Did Not Finish

Men's Shot Put
 M.C. "Charlie" Herman - Bronze, 
 Abe Zvonkin - 4th, 
 John A. Cameron
 Archie Stewart

Men's Discus Throw
 M.C. "Charlie" Herman - Silver,  
 Abe Zvonkin - Bronze,  
 George W. Sutherland
 Archie Stewart

Men's Javelin
 Doral W. Pilling - Silver,  
 Archie Stewart - 6th,  

Men's Hammer Throw
 John A. Cameron - Bronze,  
 Archie McDiarmid - 6th,  
 George W. Sutherland
 M.C. "Charlie" Herman

Men's Long Jump
 Leonard "Len" Hutton - Gold,  
 Chester Smith - 4th,  
 Gordon "Spike" Smallacombe - 5th,  

Men's Triple Jump
 Gordon "Spike" Smallacombe - Gold,  
 Leonard "Len" Hutton, Bronze,  
 George W. Sutherland - 4th,  

Men's High Jump
 William/Clarence Stargratt - Bronze,  
 Duncan Anderson McNaughton - 4th
 Gordon "Spike" Smallacombe
 Jack/John Portland

Men's Pole Vault
 Victor Pickard - Gold,  
 Robert Stoddard - Bronze,  
 Alf "Sunny" Gilbert - 4th

Boxing

Men's Flyweight Division (51 kg)
 R. Galloway - Bronze

Men's Bantamweight Division (54 kg)
 J. Keller - Bronze

Men's Lightweight Division (60 kg)
 G. Canzano - Silver

Men's Welterweight Division (67 kg)
 H. Williams - Silver

Men's Light Heavyweight Division (81 kg)
 A. Pitcher - Bronze

Men's Heavyweight Division (91 kg)
 W. Skimming - Silver

Diving

Men's High Diving/Tower
 Alfred Phillips - Gold, 147 points
 Samuel Walker - Silver, 83.3 points

Women's High Diving/Tower
 Pearl Stoneham - Gold, 39.3 points
 Helen McCormack - Silver, 38.3 points

Men's Springboard Diving
 Alfred Phillips - Gold, 90.6 points
 Cyril Kennett - Silver, 130 points
 Arthur H. Stott - Bronze, 127 points

Women's Springboard Diving
 Doris Ogilvie - Silver, 89.7 points
 H. Mollie Bailey - Bronze, 88.7 points

Lawn Bowls

Men's Doubles
 Canada - Bronze
 Arthur S. Reid
 W.W. Moore

Men's Rinks/Fours
 Canada - Silver
 Harry J. Allen
 Jimmy Campbell
 Mitch Thomas
 W. "Billy" Rae

Rowing

Men's Coxed Fours
 Canada - Silver
 A. Miles
 D.L. Gales
 H.R. McCuaig
 J.A. Butler
 R.S. Evans

Men's Coxless Fours
 Canada - Silver
 J. Gayner
 J. Fleming
 Albert Bellew
 Henry Pelham

Men's Double Sculls
 Canada - Gold
 Boles 
 Richards 

Men's Eight Oared Shell
 Canada - Bronze
 A. Taylor 
 D. Doal 
 E. Eastwood 
 F. Fry 
 J. Zabinsky 
 L. Bawks 
 L. McDonald 
 W. Moore 
 W. Thorburn

Swimming

Men's 100 Yards Freestyle
 F. Munro Bourne - Gold, 56.00 s
 Albert Gibson - Bronze

Men's 440 Yards Freestyle
 George Burleigh - Bronze

Men's 1 500 Yards Freestyle
 George Burleigh - Bronze

Men's 220 Yards Breaststroke
 Jack Aubin - Gold, 2 min 35.40 s

Women's 4 x 100 Yards Freestyle Relay
 Canada - Silver, 4 min 33.0 s
 Elizabeth "Betty" Edwards
 Irene Pirie-Milton
 Marjorie Linton
 Peggy Bailey

Men's 4 x 200 Yards Freestyle Relay
 Canada - Gold, 8 min 42.40 s
 B. Gibson 
 F. Munro Bourne 
 George Burleigh 
 Jimmy Thompson

Wrestling

Men's Bantamweight Division (57 kg)
 James Trifunov - Gold

Men's Featherweight Division (62 kg)
 Clifford Chilcott - Gold

Men's Lightweight Division (68 kg)
 Howard Thomas - Gold

Men's Welterweight Division (74 kg)
 Reg Priestly - Gold

Men's Middleweight Division (82 kg)
 Mike Chepwick - Gold

Men's Light Heavyweight Division (90 kg)
 L. McIntyre - Gold

Men's Heavyweight Division (100 kg)
 Earl McCready - Gold

Officials

See also

Canada at the Commonwealth Games

External links
Canadian Commonwealth Games Association

Nations at the 1930 British Empire Games
1930 
1930 in Canadian sports